Songshan District (Mongolian:    Сүн шан тоори Süŋ šan toɣoriɣ) is a district of the city of Chifeng, Inner Mongolia, China. The district spans 5,629 square kilometers, and has a population of 608,883 as of 2019.

Administrative divisions
The district is divided into seven subdistricts, nine towns, and five townships. These township-level divisions are then further divided into 244 administrative villages, 44 urban residential communities, and 3 rural residential communities.

Geography 
Songshan District is bordered by Ar'horqin Banner to its east, Weichang Manchu and Mongol Autonomous County to its west, Yuanbaoshan District and Hongshan District to its south, Ongniud Banner to its north, Hexigten Banner to its northwest, and Harqin Banner to its southwest.

Climate 
The district experienced 2783.5 hours of sunshine, 208 frost-free days, and 381.9 millimeters of precipitation.

Demographics 
As of 2019, the district's registered population is 608,883, an increase of 8,699 from 2018. Of this, there are 314,013 reported males and 294,870 reported females. The district has a crude birth rate of 11.2 per 1,000, and a crude mortality rate of 3.3 per 1,000, resulting in a rate of natural increase of 7.9 per 1,000. There are 604,400 permanent residents, an increase of 1,500 from 2018, of which, the urban population is 327,100.

Ethnicity

Economy 
Songshan's economy reached a GDP of 27.05 billion yuan in 2019, with its primary sector accounting for 18.0% of GDP, its secondary sector accounting for 22.6% of GDP, and the tertiary sector accounting for 59.4% of GDP.

As of 2019, urban residents had a per capita disposable income of 36,168 yuan, and rural residents had a per capita disposable income of 16,555 yuan. Retail sales in 2019 totaled 15.04 billion yuan.

The area is home to a number of gold mines. Other mineral deposits in Songshan include silver, copper, iron, lead, limestone, coal, fluorite, and perlite.

Transportation 
Major roadways which pass through Songshan District include China National Highway 111, China National Highway 305, China National Highway 306, the G16 Dandong–Xilinhot Expressway, and the G45 Daqing–Guangzhou Expressway.

The Beijing–Tongliao railway, and the Chifeng-Shenyang railway pass through Songshan.

References

County-level divisions of Inner Mongolia
Chifeng